Idris Garba Kareka is a Nigerian politician born in Jahun, Jigawa State. He represents the Jahun constituency in the Jigawa State House of Assembly under the platform of All Progressive Congress (APC), and serves as speaker of the 7th Jigawa Assembly.

Impeachment
Shortly after the 2015 general election and the 6th Jigawa Assembly was inaugurated in June, members unanimously elected Garba as speaker. On 3 January 2017 less than seven months after his swearing in, 25 of the 30 members unceremoniously called for his impeachment while the governor was away on a foreign trip. The reasons given for the impeachment were that Garba was too unyielding to the requests of his colleagues and he had claimed too much power for himself, which made his colleagues lose confidence in him. Shortly after the 2019 general elections, the 7th Jigawa Assembly was inaugurated in May and Garba was once again elected speaker.

References

External links
 Jigawa State Government. Retrieved on 1 May 2021

Nigerian politicians
Year of birth missing (living people)
Living people